The Hants and Sussex Aviation Herald was a British ultra-light single seat aircraft of the 1940s.

Design and development
The Herald was designed and built by Hants and Sussex Aviation Ltd at their factory at Portsmouth Airport two miles north of the city. The design designation H.S.1 was allocated to the aircraft. It was a single-seat ultra-light aircraft and was fitted with a fixed tricycle undercarriage. It was powered by one 40 h.p. Aeronca-JAP J-99 engine.

Operational history
The Herald was allocated the registration marks G-ALYA in February 1950. During testing at Portsmouth Airport in 1953, the aircraft's performance proved to be poor and it made a few hops before being retired. It remained at the airport until late 1955 when it was dismantled and scrapped.

Specifications

References
Notes

Bibliography

1950s British civil utility aircraft
Low-wing aircraft
Single-engined tractor aircraft
Aircraft first flown in 1953